Bernard Bilcliff (2 December 1895 – 1979) was an English footballer who played in the Football League for Chesterfield and Halifax Town.

References

1904 births
1955 deaths
English footballers
Association football goalkeepers
English Football League players
Chesterfield F.C. players
Scarborough F.C. players
Halifax Town A.F.C. players
Shelbourne F.C. players